Discografia Internazionale (or DI) was a weekly Italian popular music magazine published from 1966. The magazine's headquarters was in Piazzale Loreto in Milan. It was run by Germano Ruscitto, formerly the press officer for Bluebell Records, in association with Billboard Publications, Inc. With its focus on international recording, the magazine was intended as a rival to the long-established Italian publication Musica e Dischi.

DI's singles chart represented Italy in Billboards weekly "Hits of the World" international charts section. Together with Billboard and the United Kingdom's Record Retailer, Discografia Internazionale sponsored the annual International Music Industry Conference (IMIC), held in Montreux, Switzerland.

The magazine's final issue was published in December 1972.

References

Magazines established in 1966
Magazines disestablished in 1972
Magazines published in Milan
Music magazines published in Italy
1966 establishments in Italy
1972 disestablishments in Italy
Defunct magazines published in Italy